Mirèio (Mirèlha in classical norm) is a poem in Occitan by French writer Frédéric Mistral. It was written in 1859, after eight years of effort. Mirèio, a long poem in Provençal consisting of twelve songs, tells of the thwarted love of Vincent and Mireille, two young Provençal people of different social backgrounds. The name Mireille (Mirèio in Provence) is a doublet of the word meraviho which means wonder.

Overview

Mistral used the poem to promote the language, Occitan the lingua franca of Southern France until the vergonha, as well as to share the culture of the Provença area. He tells among other tales, of Saintes-Maries-de-la-Mer, where according to legend the dragon, Tarasque, was driven out, and of the famous and ancient Venus of Arles. He prefaced the poem with a short notice about Provençal pronunciation. Mirèio was translated into some fifteen European languages, including into French by Mistral himself. In 1863, Charles Gounod made it into an opera, Mireille.

The plot

In Provence, Mirèio is the daughter of a rich farmer. She is in love with a modest basketmaker, Vincènt. Her father disapproves of the relationship and seeks other suitors. Mirèio, in despair, escapes from her house to Saintes-Maries-de-la-Mer. There she prays to the saints that her father will accept her relationship with Vincènt. The way is hard and unbearably hot. At the end, the saints appear to Mirèio. They tell her of their happiness in Paradise, and Mirèio dies in peace.

Dedication

Mistral dedicated his book to Alphonse de Lamartine, a French writer, poet and politician who was instrumental in the foundation of the Second Republic and the continuation of the Tricolore as the flag of France, as follows:

"To Lamartine:

To you, I dedicate Mireille: It is my heart and my soul; It is the flower of my years; It is bunch of grapes from La Crau, leaves and all, a peasant's offering."

Lamartine wrote enthusiastically: "I will tell you good news today! A great epic poet is born ... A true Homeric poet in our time; ... Yes, your epic poem is a masterpiece; ... the perfume of your book will not evaporate in a thousand years."

External links

 

Full text in Occitan
Full text in English

Occitan literature
1859 poems
Frédéric Mistral